Maxillaria cucullata, the cowl-carrying maxillaria, is a species of orchid ranging from Mexico, Belize southward into Panama.

References

External links 

cucullata
Orchids of Mexico
Orchids of Central America
Orchids of Belize
Plants described in 1840